Guinea-Bissau will be participating at the 2020 Summer Paralympics in Tokyo, Japan, from 24 August to 5 September 2021. This will be their third consecutive appearance at the Summer Paralympics since 2012.

Competitors 
The following is the list of number of competitors participating in the Games:

Athletics 

Men's track

See also 
 Guinea-Bissau at the Paralympics
 Guinea-Bissau at the 2020 Summer Olympics

External links 
 Paralympics website

Nations at the 2020 Summer Paralympics
2020
Summer Paralympics